Field marshal (or field-marshal, abbreviated as FM) is the most senior military rank, ordinarily senior to the general officer ranks. Usually, it is the highest rank in an army, and as such, few persons are appointed to it. It is considered as a five-star rank (OF-10) in modern-day armed forces in many countries. Promotion to the rank of field marshal in many countries historically required extraordinary military achievement by a general (a wartime victory). However, the rank has also been used as a divisional command rank and also as a brigade command rank.  Examples of the different uses of the rank include Austria-Hungary, Pakistan, Prussia/Germany, India and Sri Lanka for an extraordinary achievement; Spain and Mexico for a divisional command; and France, Portugal and Brazil for a brigade command.

Origins
The origin of the term dates to the early Middle Ages, originally meaning the keeper of the king's horses (from Old German Marh-scalc = "horse-servant"), from the time of the early Frankish kings; words originally meaning "servant" were sometimes used to mean "subordinate official" or similar. The German Holy Roman Empire and the kingdom of France had officers named Feldmarschall and Maréchal de camp respectively as far back as the 1600s. The exact wording of the titles used by field marshals varies: examples include "marshal" and "field marshal general". The air force equivalent in Commonwealth and many Middle Eastern air forces is marshal of the air force (not to be confused with air marshal). Navies, which usually do not use the nomenclature employed by armies or air forces, use titles such as "fleet admiral," "grand admiral" or "admiral of the fleet" for the equivalent rank. The traditional attribute distinguishing a field marshal is a baton. The baton nowadays is purely ornamental, and as such may be richly decorated. That said, it is not necessary for the insignia to be a baton (Such is the case in Russia post-1991 and the former Soviet Union, which use a jewelled star referred to as a Marshal's star).

Field marshal ranks by country

Afghanistan
Sardar Shah Wali Khan (died 1977) of the Musahiban and uncle of King Mohammad Zahir Shah and President Mohammed Daoud Khan, was a field marshal. Mohammed Fahim became an honorary marshal in 2004.
Abdul Rashid Dostum became an honorary marshal in 2020 (this position is now defunct).

Australia

The first appointment to the rank was Sir William Birdwood, who received the honour in March 1925. Sir Thomas Blamey was the second appointment to the rank, and was the first and so far only Australian-born and Australian Army substantive (not honorary) field marshal. He was promoted to the rank on the insistence of Sir Robert Menzies, the Prime Minister of Australia, in June 1950. His field marshal's baton is on display in the Second World War galleries at the Australian War Memorial in Canberra. The third appointment was Prince Philip, Duke of Edinburgh, who was promoted to the rank on 1 April 1954.

Brazil

When Brazil became independent from Portugal in 1822, the Portuguese system of ranks was maintained by the Brazilian Army, including the rank of marechal de campo. In the second half of the 19th century, the rank of marechal de campo was replaced, both in Portugal and Brazil, by the rank of general de brigada (brigade general). This last rank still exists today in the Brazilian Army, but corresponds to the present rank of major-general (major-general) in the Portuguese Army. 
Today, the rank of Marechal is the maximum rank available but only awarded during wartime. The Brazilian Air Force has the similar rank of air marshal.

Chad
On the 11 August 2020, Chadian president Idris Déby was promoted to the rank of Marshal for his efforts against terrorism in West Africa. He would die the following year.

China

During Imperial rule in China, different dynasties gave different titles to generals. A very similar title is "司馬" (sima) in the Eastern Han dynasty, which literally means "master of horse", and later became a two-character surname too. "司馬" is one of the Three Excellencies in Eastern Han, who is in charge of the country's military affairs. Later, a more common title for a field marshal or a commandant was (元帥 Yuan Shuai) or grand field marshal (大元帥 da yuan shuai). One of the most famous of these generals was Yue Fei from the Song Dynasty. Since the People's Republic of China was established in 1949, it has promoted 10 military commanders to the rank of marshal, all in 1955 and abolished in 1965. Since then, the rank has remained defunct.

Ethiopia
On 8 January 2022, Chief of General staff Birhanu Jula was promoted to the rank of Field marshal (or Field marshal general, depending on source). The rank was introduced to the Ethiopian National Defense Force with this promotion. The rank of Field marshal was last used in Ethiopia during the early 20th century by Emperor Haile Selassie as head of the Imperial Ethiopian Army.

Finland

Carl Gustaf Emil Mannerheim was promoted to Field Marshal in 1933. In 1942 he was promoted to Marshal of Finland, which really is not a distinctive military rank but an honour.

France

In the French army of the Ancien Régime, the normal brigade command rank was field marshal (maréchal de camp). In 1793, during the French Revolution, the rank of field marshal was replaced by the rank of brigade general. The rank insignia of field marshal was two stars (one-star being used for a senior colonel rank). The French field marshal rank was below lieutenant-general, which in 1793 became divisional-general. In the title maréchal de camp and the English "field marshal", there is an etymological confusion in the French camp between the English words "camp" and "field". The French rank of field marshal should not be confused with the rank of Marshal of France, which has been the highest rank of the French Army since the higher dignity of Marshal General of France was abolished in 1848 (although in theory it is not an actual rank but a "state dignity").

German-speaking lands

Generalfeldmarschall (general field marshal, field marshal general, or field marshal / , abbreviated to Feldmarschall) was the most senior general officer rank in the armies of several German states, including Saxony, Brandenburg-Prussia, Prussia, the German Empire, and lastly, Germany (from 1918). In the Habsburg monarchy, the Austrian Empire and Austria-Hungary, the rank Feldmarschall was used. The rank was also given to generals in southern German States and Austria by the Holy Roman Emperor during the existence of the Holy Roman Empire up to 1806.

Greece

Stratarches, meaning Ruler of the Army in Greek, is a title for senior military commanders dating back to classical antiquity, in the sense of "commander-in-chief". In modern Greek usage, it has been used to translate the rank of field marshal. In this sense, the rank was borne by the Kings of Greece since 1939, and has been awarded only once in modern Greek history to a professional officer: Alexandros Papagos in 1949 for his leadership in the Greek victory against Fascist Italy in World War II and against the Communist forces in the Greek Civil War. The rank is not retained by the current (since 1974) Third Hellenic Republic.

India

Field marshal is the highest attainable rank in the Indian Army. It is a ceremonial / war time rank. There have been two Indian field marshals to date. Sam Manekshaw was promoted to the rank in 1973 for his role in leading the Indian Army to victory in the Indo-Pakistani War of 1971. K. M. Cariappa was promoted in 1986, long after he retired, in recognition of his services as the first Indian Commander-in-Chief of the Indian Army.

Libya

Khalifa Haftar was the first to receive this rank in Libya from the House of Representatives (Libya) in 2016 after the liberation of oil ports in the Operation Swift Lightning.

Malaysia 
Field Marshal of Malaysia is equivalent to general of the army of the United States which is the highest rank in the Malaysian army and are reserved for His Majesty the King of Malaysia though there are several non-royals who hold this rank.

Pakistan

Ayub Khan (1907–1974) was the only field marshal in the history of Pakistan. He was the second president of Pakistan and the first native commander in chief of the army.

Philippines

US Army General Douglas MacArthur was the first and only field marshal in the history of the Philippine Army, a position he held while also acting as the Military Advisor to the Commonwealth Government of the Philippines with a rank of major general. President Quezon conferred the rank of field marshal on 24 August 1936 and MacArthur's duty included the supervision of the creation of the Philippines nation-state.

Portugal

In the Portuguese Army, the rank of marechal de campo was created in 1762, as the most junior general officer rank. Hierarchically, it was between the rank of tenente-general (lieutenant-general) and the rank of brigadeiro (brigadier), this last one not being considered a general rank, but a kind of senior colonel.

In Portugal, the ranks of marechal-general (marshal-general) and marechal do Exército (marechal of the Army) or simply marechal also existed. Distinctively from the rank of marechal de campo, the ranks of marechal-general and marechal were the highest in the Portuguese Army, usually being reserved for the commanders-in-chief of the Army. Latter, the rank of marechal-general became reserved for the Monarch, as a mere honorary dignity.

Romania

Mareșal is the highest rank in the Romanian Armed Forces.  The rank of mareșal can only be bestowed to a general or admiral, in time of war for exceptional military merits, by the President of Romania and confirmed by the Supreme Council of National Defense.

Russia/Soviet Union

Imperial Russia had for a long time maintained the rank of Field Marshal. It was active all the way until the Russian Revolutions of 1917. When the Bolsheviks took over, they briefly abandoned military ranks until 1935. When it was restored, an equivalent rank Marshal of the Soviet Union was introduced in place of the Imperial Russian Army Field Marshal. Following the dissolution of the Soviet Union, the rank was replaced by the Marshal of the Russian Federation.

Serbia and Yugoslavia

The closest equivalent of a five-star general in Serbia was Vojvoda (Serbia and Yugoslavia), a military rank that has many similarities compared to Generalfeldmarschall, Marshal of France and Field marshal (United Kingdom) but also differs in way of promotion, duration and style. However, the name of this military is etymologically closer to the nobility title of duke. It was the highest rank in the army of the Kingdom of Serbia and Kingdom of Yugoslavia until the Second World War. It was first created with the passing of the law on the Organization of the Army of the Kingdom of Serbia in 1901. The law was passed on the suggestion of Lieutenant Colonel (later Divisional General) Miloš Vasić, who was minister of defense at the time. The rank was awarded only during the war for particular military contributions of top generals. Only four Serbian generals have reached the rank of Vojvoda, most notably Radomir Putnik.

Layer Yugoslav People's Army had the rank of Marshal of Yugoslavia used only by Josip Broz Tito as the supreme commander. This would actually be one rank above the rank of Field marshal and the equivalent of a six-star general, but it was essentially an honorific title with political connotations that became Tito's best-known nickname.

South Africa 

South African statesman and prime minister Jan Smuts was appointed a field marshal of the British Army on 24 May 1941.

South Korea 
During the 2010s, the South Korean government tried to promote Paik Sun-yup to the rank of field marshal. However, the attempt failed because of his past service in the Manchukuo Imperial Army.

Sri Lanka

Field Marshal is the highest rank in the Sri Lanka Army. It is a ceremonial rank. Sarath Fonseka is the first and only Sri Lankan officer to hold the rank. He was promoted to the position on 22 March 2015.

Sweden 
 
In Sweden, a total of 75 field marshals have been appointed, from 1609 to 1824. Since 1972, the rank has not been used in Sweden, and it had long been decided to only be used in wartime.

The title denoted the commander of the mounted part of the army. During the Thirty Years' War, the field marshal was subordinate to the country's lieutenant general. In the Swedish army, the field marshal had unlimited military and considerable political authority. However, the field marshal was subordinate to the Lord High Constable of Sweden (Riksmärsken) and his closest man was the rikstygmästaren.

Initially, the field marshal was the commander of the cavalry and first became the foremost military rank in Sweden during the early 17th century, especially after Jakob Pontusson de la Gardie received the rank.

Syria 
Field Marshal is the highest rank within the Syrian Army which is a ceremonial and honorary military rank, the only holder to-date is incumbent President Bashar al-Assad who was promoted from Colonel. Its insignia is unique amongst Arab states, as the majority of Arab militaries that has a Field Marshal rank, the insignias has the national coat of arms or a crown above two crossed batons or swords surrounded by yellow leaves below, Syria's Marshal rank adds an extra star to its General insignia ergo three stars above crossed swords below the coat of arms.

Thailand

In the Royal Thai Army the rank of Chom Phon was created in 1888, together with all other military ranks along western lines, by King Chulalongkorn. Until the first appointment in 1910, the rank was reserved solely for the reigning monarch. Currently the rank is in abeyance.

Turkey

In the Turkish Armed Forces, the corresponding rank is mareşal. Its origins can be traced to the Ottoman Empire and to the military of Persia, where it was called "müşir"  and bestowed upon senior commanders upon order of the ruling sultan. The rank of mareşal can only be bestowed by the National Assembly, and only given to a general who leads an army, navy or air force successfully in three battles or at various front lines at the same time, gaining a victory over the enemy. Only two persons have been bestowed the rank: Kemal Atatürk, the founder of modern Turkey, and his Chief of Staff Fevzi Çakmak, both for their successes in the Turkish War of Independence.

Uganda

Field Marshal Idi Amin was the military dictator and third president of Uganda from 1971 to 1979. Amin joined the British colonial regiment, the King's African Rifles in 1946, serving in Somalia and Kenya. Eventually, Amin held the rank of major general in the post-colonial Ugandan Army and became its commander before seizing power in the military coup of January 1971, deposing Milton Obote. He later promoted himself to field marshal while he was the head of state.

United Kingdom

Arthur Wellesley, 1st Duke of Wellington, was promoted to the rank of a field marshal (of multiple armies) in 1813. Nine of his field marshal batons are on display in Apsley House (see Batons of Arthur Wellesley, 1st Duke of Wellington).

United States 
No branch of the United States Armed Forces has ever used the rank of field marshal. On 14 December 1944, Congress created the rank of "general of the army", a five-star rank equivalent to that of field marshal in other countries. Two days later, George Marshall was promoted to this rank, becoming the first five-star general in American history. It has been suggested that the denomination of "Marshal" for a five-star officer was not adopted because, otherwise, George Marshall would be addressed as "Marshal Marshall", which was considered undignified. Thus, Douglas MacArthur is the only US officer ever to have received the rank of Marshal, which was given to him by the government of the Philippines.

Yemen
Abdrabbuh Mansur Hadi, former President of Yemen and Field Marshal of the Republic of Yemen Armed Forces
Mahdi al-Mashat, Chairman of the Supreme Political Council of Yemen, and Field Marshal

Zaire

On the 17 June 1983, Mobutu Sese Seko promoted himself to the rank of field marshal. The order was signed by General Likulia Bolongo.

Insignia

Variants

Feldmarschall (Austro-Hungarian monarchy)
Stožerni general (Croatia)
Marshal of the Empire (First French Empire)
Stratarches (Greece)
Marshal of Italy
Wonsu (North & South Korea)
 Mushir (Ottoman Empire, Middle East & North Africa)
Marshal of Peru
Marshal of Poland
General field marshal (Imperial Russia)
Marshal of the Russian Federation
Marshal of the Soviet Union
Fältmarskalk (Sweden)
Chom phon (Thailand)

See also
 Admiralissimo
 Generalissimo
 Marshal
 Grand Marshal
 Grand Admiral
 Admiral of the Fleet 
 List of Field Marshals
 List of German Field Marshals
 General of the Army
 Admiral of the Navy
 General of the Air Force

References

External links 
 

 
Military ranks